Astemir Apanasov (born September 21, 1989, Nalchik) is a Circassian singer, musician, composer, and actor.

He received seceral awards including Honored Artist of the Republic of Adygea, Honored Artist Of the Kabardino-Balkarian Republic, Honored Artist of the Karachay-Cherkess Republic, Grand Prix of the All-Russian competition "Blue Bird", victory in the final and superfinal of the television competition "Morning Star" (2003), Winner of the International Competition "Hopes of Europe", laureate of the International Theater Festival Fringe in Edinburgh (Scotland), laureate of the IV Annual Prize of the first all-Caucasian ethnomusic TV channel "9 Wave", laureate of the I and II prizes of the International Competition "Hopes of Europe".

Biography 
He was born to a Circassian Chemguy-Kabardian family on September 21, 1989, in the city of Nalchik of the Kabardino-Balkarian Autonomous Soviet Socialist Republic. He studied under the guidance of Professor Valery Garkalin.

Activity 
He participated in creative projects together with Sergei Bezrukov, Maxim Razuvaev, Vladimir Pankov, Stas Namin, Yulia Mikhalchik and Aleksey Goman. He participated in the television program "Big Difference". He worked in conjunction with the Circassian "Coffeetime" group.

In theater 

 Musical "Three Musketeers", dir. S. Krasnoperets - D'Artanyan, guardsman, musketeer.
 Musical "Hair", dir. Beau Crowell (USA), Stas Namin - Claude, the tribe of love.
 S. Mrozhek "Serenade", dir. Valery Garkalin - Head of the family.
 "On the verge of spring", dir. M. Razuvaev, A. Davydov, G. Auerbach.
 "Little Witch" dir. P. Gaiduchenko and O. Lopukhov are a raven.
 "Above the clear blue sky", dir. A. Rubinstein (England, Edinburgh).
 Beatlemania, dir. Stas Namin.
 Snow White and the Seven Dwarfs, dir. A. Davydov - Friday-gnome, Queen's advisor.
 Alice in Wonderland, dir. I. Zamotaev, A. Prokuratov.
 The Bremen Town Musicians is a jester.
 V. Voinovich "Soldier Ivan Chonkin", dir. Andrey Rossinsky, with the participation of Vladimir Voinovich.
 A. Ostrovsky "The Snow Maiden", dir. Vladimir Pankov.
 B. Vasiliev "Tomorrow Was the War" dir. per. RF M. Razuvaev - Sasha Stameskin.
 A. Pushkin "Feast during the plague" dir. per. RF M. Razuvaev.
 The Broadway Musical "Chaplin" Role - Chaplin directed by Warren Carlisle

In films and television 

 Main Stage 2 (2015) as part of the Coffee Time Band.
 "Big difference"
 "Shelter of Comedians"
 "Life Line" in 2009
 Channel "First game" - TV presenter.

References 

Living people
1989 births
Musicians from Nalchik
Circassian people of Russia
21st-century Russian male singers
21st-century Russian singers